WKCW is an Adult Hits formatted broadcast radio station licensed to Warrenton, Virginia, serving Fauquier and Prince William counties in Virginia.  WKCW is owned and operated by Radio Companion, LLC.

References

External links

1957 establishments in Virginia
Adult hits radio stations in the United States
Radio stations established in 1957
KCW